A referendum on holding early parliamentary elections was held in Slovakia on 11 November 2000. Although approved by 95.1% of those voting, voter turnout was just 20% and the referendum was declared invalid due to insufficient turnout.

Results

References

2000 referendums
Referendums in Slovakia
2000 in Slovakia
November 2000 events in Europe